Saint-Michel-en-l'Herm is a commune in the Vendée department in the Pays de la Loire region in western France.

One of the most famous local landmarks is the Abbey of Saint-Michel-en-l'Herm. The abbey dates from 682 AD when it was constructed by Benedictine monks from Noirmoutier. In 1569, Protestants attacked it, killing approximately 200 monks. The motives for the attack are still debated, but one theory is that the attackers sought treasure and manuscripts hidden by the Bishop of Luçon.

See also
Communes of the Vendée department

References

Communes of Vendée